Tony Ring (born 3 March 1964), is a Swedish politician and former racing driver who is serving as the chairman of the municipal board in Karlskoga Municipality. He is a member of the Moderate Party.

Between 2014 and 2018 he was the leader of the opposition in Karlskoga. He was elected chairman of the municipal board following the 2018 election.

In 2020, Ring was listed by Fokus magazine as one of the most powerful outside of Stockholm.

References 

Moderate Party politicians
Living people

21st-century Swedish politicians
1964 births
Swedish sports broadcasters
Swedish racing drivers
Municipal commissioners of Sweden